The Shaumari Wildlife Reserve is a Jordanian nature reserve near the town of Azraq, approximately  east of Amman.

It is a regionally important reserve created in 1975 by the Royal Society for the Conservation of Nature as a breeding center for endangered or locally extinct wildlife. The  reserve is a thriving protected environment for some of the most threatened species of animals in the Middle East. Some of the species include Arabian oryx, Somali ostriches, Persian onagers (an Asian wild ass from Iran) and gazelles.

References

External Links 
Photos of Shaumari Wildlife Reserve at the American Center of Research

Nature reserves in Jordan